Smithfield is a town that is located in Providence County, Rhode Island, United States. It includes the historic villages of Esmond, Georgiaville, Mountaindale, Hanton City, Stillwater and Greenville. The population was 22,118 at the 2020 census.  Smithfield is the home of Bryant University, a private four year college.

History

The area comprising modern-day Smithfield was first settled in 1663 as a farming community by several British colonists, including John Steere.  The area was originally within the boundaries of Providence until 1731 when Smithfield was incorporated as a separate town.  The town was named after John Smith, a first settler of Providence, according to the town's official website.

Chief Justice Peleg Arnold lived in early Smithfield, and his 1690 home still stands today. There was an active Quaker community in early 18th century Smithfield that extended along the Great Road, from what is today Woonsocket, north into south Uxbridge, Massachusetts. This Quaker community, and its members, became influential in the abolition movement, with members such as Effingham Capron and Abby Kelley Foster, and also gave rise to other Quaker settlements including one at Adams, Massachusetts, where Susan B. Anthony was born as an early member. Elizabeth Buffum Chace is a well-known person from Smithfield who was influential in both the abolition of slavery, and the women's rights movement.

Captain James Buxton, a Revolutionary War figure, served with a Massachusetts regiment at Valley Forge, was promoted to the rank of Captain, and later granted Massachusetts land for his war service by Governor John Hancock.   

During the Industrial Revolution, Smithfield transformed from an agrarian community to a manufacturing center, with several textiles mills being founded along the Woonasquatucket River by the mid-1800s.

In 1871, the towns of North Smithfield, Lincoln, and Central Falls became separate municipalities. The colonial ghost town of Hanton City is located within the boundaries of present-day Smithfield, but was a completely separate community in the eighteenth century.

In 1943, a U.S. Army Air Corps Lockheed RB-34 crashed on Wolf Hill, killing all three servicemen aboard.

Geography
According to the United States Census Bureau, the town has a total area of 71.9 km2 (27.8 mi2), of which 68.9 km2 (26.6 mi2) of is land and 3.1 km2 (1.2 mi2) of is water.  The total area is 4.25% water.

Demographics 

As of the 2020 United States Census, Smithfield has 22,118 residents with a median age of 43.7 years and 15.4% of the population under the age of 18. The racial makeup as of 2020 was 84.7% White, 1.2% African Americans, 0.2% Native American, 7.5% Asian, 1.8% from other races and 4.3% of two or more races. Hispanic and Latino of any race made up 3.7% of the population. The median household income is $85,337 and 3.4% of the population live below the poverty line.

Education 

Smithfield contains three public elementary schools (Pleasant View, Raymond LaPerche, and Old County Road School), a middle school (Vincent J. Gallagher Middle School) and a public high school, Smithfield High School which was ranked 17th out of 52 high schools in Rhode Island in 2006. St. Phillip's School, a private Roman Catholic academy offering education in grades K–8, is situated in Greenville. Mater Ecclesiae College, a Catholic college, was also located in the town in a facility that was formerly the St. Aloysius Orphanage until the college closed in 2015. Partnered with Saint Raphael Academy in Pawtucket, the private Catholic boarding school Overbrook Academy currently resides those same facilities for middle school, high school, and summer camp programs.

Bryant University 

Bryant University, a private university with programs in business and the arts and sciences, is located in Smithfield.

In 1971, the University moved to its current campus in Smithfield when the founder of Tupperware, Earl Silas Tupper, a Bryant alumnus, donated the current  of land to be the new campus. The famous Bryant Archway was also relocated. The old Emin Homestead and Captain Joseph Mowry homestead occupied much of the land that makes up the present day Smithfield campus. The land was purchased and farmed for three generations between the late 19th century and the mid-20th century. Today, many descendants of the original Emin settlers still live near the Bryant campus. The school also claims a handful of family members as alumni and offers a scholarship for accounting students as a tribute to the Emin family. Historical pictures of the Emin Homestead can still be found in the Alumni house.

Economy

Principal employers
According to Smithfield's 2021 Comprehensive Annual Financial Report, the principal employers in the city are:

Notable people

 Cyrus Aldrich (1808–1871), born in Smithfield, United States Congressman from Minnesota
 Peleg Arnold (1751–1820), delegate to the Continental Congress
 Sullivan Ballou (1829–1861), Civil War Officer and author of the Sullivan Ballou Letter
 Emeline S. Burlingame (1836–1923), editor and evangelist
 Adin B. Capron (1841–1911), United States Congressman
 Elizabeth Buffum Chace (1806–1899), activist in the Anti-Slavery, Women's Rights, and Prison Reform Movements of the mid to late 19th century
Edward Harris, (1801–1872), manufacturer, philanthropist, and abolitionist
 Ronald K. Machtley (born 1948), United States Congressman, President of Bryant University (1996–2020)
 Daniel Mowry Jr. (1729–1806), delegate to the Continental Congress
 James W. Nuttall (born 1953), United States Army Major General, Deputy Director of the Army National Guard and Deputy Commander of the First Army
 Don Orsillo (born 1968), play-by-play announcer for Boston Red Sox games on the New England Sports Network (NESN)
 Gina Raimondo (born 1971), United States Secretary of Commerce (2021–), 75th Governor of Rhode Island (2015–2021)
 Danny Smith (writer) (born 1959), producer, writer, and voice actor
 William Stillman Stanley, Jr., politician
 Arthur Steere (1865–1943), politician, businessman
 Alexander Warner (1827–1914), businessman and politician
 David Wilkinson (1771–1852), co-builder of Slater Mill
 William Winsor, education philanthropist, namesake of the William Winsor School

See also

References

External links

 Smithfield official website
 City-Data.com
	

 
Towns in Providence County, Rhode Island
Providence metropolitan area
Towns in Rhode Island